A language game (also called a cant, secret language, ludling, or argot) is a system of manipulating spoken words to render them incomprehensible to an untrained listener. Language games are used primarily by groups attempting to conceal their conversations from others. Some common examples are Pig Latin; the Gibberish family, prevalent in the United States and Sweden; and Verlan, spoken in France.

A common difficulty with language games is that they are usually passed down orally; while written translations can be made, they are often imperfect, and thus spelling can vary widely.
Some factions argue that words in these spoken tongues should simply be written the way they are pronounced, while others insist that the purity of language demands that the transformation remain visible when the words are imparted to paper.

Use
Some language games such as Pig Latin are so widely known that privacy is virtually impossible, as most people have a passable understanding of how it works and the words can sound very similar to their English counterpart. Although language games are not usually used in everyday conversation, some words from language games have made their way into normal speech, such as ixnay in English (from Pig Latin), and loufoque in French (from Louchébem).

Classification
One way in which language games could be organized is by language. For example, Pig Latin, Ubbi Dubbi, and Tutnese could all be in the "English" category, and Jeringonza could be in the "Spanish", ("Portuguese", or "Italian") category.

An alternate method of classifying language games is by their function. For example, Ubbi Dubbi, Bicycle, and  all work by inserting a code syllable before the vowel in each syllable. Therefore, these could be classified in the Gibberish family. Also, Double Talk, Língua do Pê, Jeringonza, and B-Sprache all work by adding a consonant after the vowel in each syllable, and then repeating the vowel. Thus, these could be classified in the Double Talk family. Another common type of language game is the spoonerism, in which the onsets of two words are exchanged. Using a standard word for each transformation gives another type, for example, the Finnish "kontinkieli", where kontti is added after each word, and spoonerism applied (kondäntti koonerismspontti koppliedäntti).

List of common language games

Additionally, Auflinger described some types of speech disguise in some languages near the city of Madang in Papua New Guinea.

See also
 Word game
 Word play
 Cant (language)

References

External links
 English Grammar Game Find Verb, Noun.
 Language Games A long summary on language games, including descriptions of many games, and an extensive bibliography.
 Language Games - Part 2 A follow-up summary with additional descriptions and bibliography.
 Nevbosh — a language game used by J. R. R. Tolkien, the inventor of Quenya and Sindarin Elvish, as a child.
 English-language post on Jeringonza — a language game equivalent of Pig Latin used in some Romance Languages.

 
Word play